Rafał Cieśla (born 16 March 1967) is a retired Polish athlete specialising in the sprint hurdles. He represented his country at two World Indoor Championships and two European Indoor Championships.

His personal bests are 13.66 seconds in the 110 metres hurdles (+1.6 m/s, Warsaw 1992) and 7.63 seconds in the 60 metres hurdles (Spała 1992).

International competitions

References

1967 births
Living people
Polish male hurdlers
Place of birth missing (living people)
20th-century Polish people
21st-century Polish people